Central District Football Club is an Australian rules football club which plays in the South Australian National Football League. Based at Elizabeth in the City of Playford about 25 km to the north of Adelaide, South Australia the club's development zones include the outer Adelaide northern suburbs of Salisbury, Elizabeth, Golden Grove, Greenwith, Township of Gawler, One Tree Hill and Barossa Valley Districts.

Origins and background

Football clubs had been first established in the outer northern areas beyond metropolitan Adelaide at Salisbury (1880), Kapunda (1866) and Gawler (1868) who fielded a team for 4 seasons (1887–1890) in the early years of the South Australian Football Association(1877–1906) what would eventually become South Australian National Football League.

Gawler finished bottom of ladder for the 1890 SAFA season with 2 draws from its 14 games and was withdrew at the end of the season and formed its own local competition, the predecessor of the current Barossa Light & Gawler Football Association. In 1899, with the introduction of compulsory Electorate Football Districts, Gawler which was assigned the Electoral district of Barossa wrote to the SAFA informing them that there interested in joining.

During the mid to late 1950s a team from the newly created and developing satellite City of Elizabeth to the outer north of Adelaide between the older townships of Salisbury and Gawler, was noticeable by its absence from SANFL ranks. Fred Rogers, Secretary of the Gawler Football League and heavily involved with the local junior competition, made an unofficial approach to SANFL President Thomas Seymour Hill regarding an admission of a League club from the growing Northern suburbs of Adelaide.

Birth of a new SANFL Club

A new team the Central District Football Club was formed in 1959, and served a five-year apprenticeship in the SANFL reserves competition (1959–1963), before entering the senior ranks together with Woodville Football Club for the 1964 SANFL season. For the inaugural season John Delo a former West Torrens ruckman was appointed the club's first captain.

The name Central District was synonymous with a Queen's Birthday Holiday Football Carnival contested by the Gawler, Barossa, Adelaide Plains and Mid-North Football Leagues. The club's name was derived to represent a district, bringing together people from the fast-growing urban northern Adelaide areas of Salisbury, Elizabeth together with Gawler, Adelaide Plains, Barossa Valley and the Mid-North. The new football Club gave an entire area a team to follow in the South Australian National Football League (SANFL) competition.

Club Colours and Supporters

Uniquely for an Australian Rules Football Club, Centrals have a very strong British migrant identity and supporter base as Elizabeth was a centre of UK migrant settlements in Adelaide, South Australia. The colours and emblem of the club also reflect this rich British background. The colours were adopted from a UK soccer side depicted on a souvenir card however the exact identity of which club inspired the colours has not been revealed. To this day, many Central supporters carry Union Jack flags at matches and sport UK soccer paraphernalia. The colours were also influenced by Footscray in the VFL, the new club's inaugural patron, and the same Bulldog emblem was adopted for its working-class connotations.

With this British background, Centrals also have a reputation for their fans singing and chanting in the manner of UK Association Football supporters. The chants 'Ceeeeentrals' and 'You Dogs' are their most well known chants/songs.

During the Premiership years from 2000 – 2010, Centrals enjoyed healthy home crowds, with a highest being 7,329 against Sturt in 2006.

Finals Campaign Disappointments(1964–1999)

West Adelaide 1961 Premiership Player and 1962 Margarey Medallist Ken Eustice was appointed as Central's Captain and Coach for the 1964 Season. Whilst waiting for his clearance from West Adelaide Gary Window was the acting Captain. Centrals first season in the league ranks the 1964 SANFL season ended without a single league victory, and therefore finished bottom of the table with an average losing margin of 64 points (Centrals have won only one wooden spoon since, being in the 1977 season). The first league victory came against Woodville by 17 points in the 2nd round of the 1965 season. From its first season of league football in 1964, Centrals struggled for success during its early years. For the period 1964 to 1970 (first 7 seasons) the Bulldogs failed to qualify for the Finals. They played 140 matches – won 32 (22.86%) and lost 108 (including every match against Port Adelaide and Sturt).

First Finals Campaigns (1971 and 1972)

Centrals made the Top 4 for the first time for the 1971 SANFL season after winning just 3 games in the first 10 rounds, they won 9 out of the last 11 games including a first-ever win against Port Adelaide. The Bullogs played and won its first-ever final (1971 First semi-final) against Sturt after trailing by 5pts at 3 quarter time by 27 points. This was Centrals first-ever win against the Double Blues after 16 straight losses and ended Sturt's run of 5 consecutive winning Premierships from 1966 to 1970.  However, before a Crowd of 42,909 the Bulldogs lost the preliminary final to Port Adelaide by 29 points after scores were level at half time. The reserves team Captain Coached by former senior's player Gary Window won the 1971 Reserves Grand Final.

Tony Casserley was appointed Captain Coach the following year for the 1972 SANFL season. Centrals started the season with their best ever form winning 10 out of the first 12 games (only loses against Port Rd 7 and Sturt Rd 10) and had their best minor round to date (14 wins and just 7 losses) and again making the Top 4. The Bulldogs won the first semi final this time against Norwood by 30 points but again lost the preliminary final against Port Adelaide this time by 6 points (15–14 to 15–20) after leading at 3 quarter time by 21 points.

First Minor Premiership (1979)

After finishing with the wooden spoon in 1977, Daryl Hicks a former premiership player with Sturt (1966–69) and State Player was appointed coach in 1978 and took the Bulldogs to the minor premiership for the first time in the 1979 SANFL season (15 wins 1 draw and 6 losses) but lost the second semi final to Port Adelaide by 26 points after leading at half-time by 14 points and then lost the preliminary final against South Adelaide by 13 points after trailing by 35 points at 3 quarter time (Scoring 7–5 to 4–1 in the last quarter). This made Centrals one of few teams in the SANFL to have won the minor premiership and not made the grand final.

The 1980 SANFL season started with a Blockbuster game at Home to the 1979 Premiers Port Adelaide in Rd1. In the previous 16 seasons (1964 to 1979) Centrals had only defeated Port Adelaide 5 times (1971 Rd 14, 1973 3 times – Rd 1, Rd 10, Rd 20, 1979 – Rd 18).
With Centrals leading by 24 points at 3 quarter time the game ended in a thrilling draw (9–18 to 9–18) with Port scoring 4–6 to Centrals 0–6 in the last quarter before an almost full house at Elizabeth of 15,696 spectators. (Record crowd for Elizabeth Oval until broken in 1984). The following week Centrals after trailing by 19pts at 3 quarter time defeated the 1979 losing Grand Finalists South Adelaide by 1 pt. After two thrilling games to start the 1980s the rest of the decade entered into disappointment as Centrals failed to win any finals game after qualifying for the finals series under 3 different coaches – Daryl Hicks 1982, Kevin Neale 1984 and Neil Kerley in 1988 and 1989.

In 1984, Kevin Cowboy Neale a former St Kilda Premiership player from 1966 replaced Daryl Hicks as Coach. In one of its best ever Minor Seasons Neale coached Central District to 3rd place in the minor round in 1984 just 1 win of top position with 16 wins and 6 losses (Which was a better record than 1979 and included 2 wins over Norwood that season's premiers – Rd2 by 43 pts and Rd14 by 95 pts). The minor round was competitive all year. At the end of Round 17 the Bulldogs were on top of the ladder but dropped to 3rd after losses to Port Adelaide in Rd 18 and Glenelg in Rd 19. Round 20 with two rounds left the top 3 teams were only separated by 1 win and very little percentage (Port 15 wins 54.96% , Glenelg 15 wins 54.80%, Centrals 14 wins 54.44%, South 13 wins 55.44% and Norwood 5th with 11 wins). However, despite leading at 1/4 time the Bulldogs again lost both finals (like in 1979) this time the Qualifying Final to Glenelg by 48pts and the 1st Semi Final to Norwood by 13 pts to finish in 4th. (Whilst Norwood went from 5th place and took out their 2nd flag within 3 years). The next 3 seasons the club failed to qualify for the finals under Neale finishing in 6th in 1985 and 1986 and then 8th place in 1987.

In 1988, Neil Kerley was appointed Coach. The club finished the minor round in 2nd place in 1988 (15 wins and 1 draw just the 1/2 game behind Port Adelaide after being at the top of the ladder after Round 19. Loses to Woodville in Rd 20 and Port Adelaide in Rd21 cost the club the minor premiership). The Bulldogs again lost both finals in 1988 and 1989 and finished in 4th place. Again it then dropped out of the top 5 and finished 7th in 1990.

The club lost 12 consecutive finals games it contested between the 1972 Preliminary until the 1994 1st Semi Final. As a result, though often competitive at times in the course of the minor rounds against the stronger teams Centrals became known as something of a choking team in the final series during the 1980s and 90s (i.e. it plays well except for when it really matters).

Finals Losses Hoodoo Broken (1994) and First Grand Finals(1995 and 1996)

Alan Stewart is the person most widely thought responsible for the upsurge in Centrals fortunes. Stewart only played two league matches for the Bulldogs and spent the rest of his career in the reserves, however, it was as a coach in both the youth sections and eventually the league team that he is most revered for at the club. Taking over from Neil Kerley in 1991, Stewart transformed the ethos of the club in only a matter of years. In 1994, Centrals made the SANFL Cup Grand Final (now no longer a separate competition), their first-ever Grand Final appearance, narrowly losing to Woodville-West Torrens. Later in the same year, Centrals defeated Norwood in the 1994 First Semi Final by 4 points, breaking a sequence of 4 Final losses to the Redlegs, and giving the club its first win in any final since beating the same team in the 1972 First Semi-Final.

With the finals hoodoo finally broken after 22 seasons, Centrals finished Minor Premiers for the 2nd time in 1995 (16 wins 1 draw and 5 losses), but lost to Port Adelaide in the 2nd Semi-Final by just 2pts (after trailing by 27 pts at 3 quarter time). However, the following week Centrals won their first-ever Preliminary Final this time against Norwood by 24 points to make their first League Grand Final, an event of such significance in the SANFL that the 1995 Grand Final sold out (the first time this had happened since the Adelaide Crows had entered the AFL in 1991). Central's Captain Roger Girdham won the toss and choose to kick into the wind in the 1st Quarter. Unfortunately, Centrals trailing by just 5 points (3-6 to 3–11) at half time were outplayed in the 2nd half and beaten in the 1995 Grand Final by  (13.16 (94) to 6.10 (46)) in front of 45,786 fans, and Alan Stewart left the club immediately afterward, ironically taking up a recruitment position with Port Adelaide in time for their entry into the Australian Football League for the 1997 Season.

Former Sydney Swans star player Stevie Wright and brother of former player Michael Wright became league coach in 1996 and Centrals finished Minor Premiers for the 3rd time (15 wins 5 losses) and for the first time defeated Port Adelaide in a Finals Match after 8 successive loses (2nd Semi Final by 24 points ) which saw Centrals make their 2nd Grand Final, once again facing Port Adelaide (who defeated Norwood in the Prelim by just 4 points after a late goal). Despite having a 4–0 win/loss (Rd2, Rd11, Rd20, and 2nd Semi) record over Port Adelaide for the season which made Centrals the favourites for the 1996 SANFL Grand Final, they again lost to the Port Magpies 11.14 (80) to 6.8 (44) in front of 46,120 at Football Park. As of 2020 this is the record crowd for an SANFL match involving Central District and stands as the best-attended SANFL Grand Final since the formation of the Adelaide Crows for the 1991 AFL Season when 50,589 saw Port Adelaide defeat Glenelg in 1990.

Stevie Wright who was the Premiership Coach (1993 and 1994) at Clarence in Tasmania enticed Danny Hulm a 22-year-old midfielder who was a member of the 1993 and 1994 Clarence premiership teams, Tasmania representative (1994–1996) and Best on Ground in the 1996 Tasmania Grand Final to join Centrals in 1997. Danny won Central's Best and Fairest in 1997 in his first season at the club, represented South Australia 3 times (1998–2000), Vice Captained South Australia in 1999 and Captained South Australia in 2000.

Peter Jonas a former Central's player and all Australian in 1979 became Coach in 1998. John Platten and Scott Lee were appointed co-captains. Centrals 1998 Finals campaign ended with a lost to Port Adelaide this time in the Elimination Final. Danny Hulm was appointed Club Captain in 1999.

At the end of the 1999 season Centrals Finals record was Played 26 – Won 6 Lost 20.

Decade of Domination – 12 Consecutive Grand Finals (2000–2011)

From the 2000 Season, Centrals built a decade of domination a dynasty rivalled in SANFL history only by the great Port Adelaide teams of the 1950s and 1990s and Sturt teams of the 1960s. Centrals were clearly the dominant side in the 2000s SANFL football competition winning 9 premierships (2000–2001, 2003–2005, 2007–2010) and appearing in every Grand Final between 2000 and 2011, and were the wealthiest SANFL club by some considerable margin (not counting Port Adelaide). Centrals played in 28 Finals games between 2000 and 2011 for a total of 25 wins (which included 12 consecutive 2nd Semi Final wins) and just 3 losses the 2002, 2006, 2011 Grand Finals.

2000 – For more than 100 years one of Port Adelaide, Norwood, North Adelaide or Sturt appeared in every Grand Final. The year 2000 saw the two newest teams Central District and Woodville-West Torrens play off in the Grand Final with Centrals prevailing by 22 points (8.13 to 5.9) for their first SANFL Premiership. Coach Peter Jonas joined St Kilda under SA and VFL/AFL Legend Malcolm Blight and inaugural Premiership captain Daniel Hulm retired at age 25 due to a persistent groin injury and having secured a job in London. Personal tragedy struck when Danny was killed instantly after being hit by a fast train at Surbiton Station in London on 13 March 2001.

2001 – Former North Melbourne and Melbourne Player Alastair Clarkson aged 32 was appointed senior coach and Daniel Healey Captain. The Bulldogs won back to back flags against the Eagles which become known as "Bark to Bark". []

2002 – Centrals after finishing minor premiers with a 18 wins to 2 losses record (both losses against Norwood who finished the minor round in 2nd place with a 17–3 record) and then winning the 2nd Semi Final by 14 points which was their 4th victory of the season over Sturt (Previous margins 38, 50 and 30 points) the Bulldogs had a shock loss to the Double Blues in the Grand Final in an attempt for a 3rd successive flag. After losing the toss of the coin and having to kick against the wind in the first quarter, missing a chance for early goal and then Damian Hicks going off with injured ribs Centrals had their worst start in a Grand Final scoring just 1 point in the 1st quarter. Sturt then continued to outplay the Dogs in the 2nd quarter with scores being 7.7 (49) to 0.1 (1) at the 19min mark of the term. A couple of goals before half time didn't help to close the gap with scores being 2.4 (16) to 8.7 (55). Sturt to continue to outscore Centrals in the last two quarters with the final scores being 6.9 (45) to 13.14 (92) for the Dogs to suffer an even worst defeat than when the losing the Grand Final in 1996 to Port Adelaide.

2003 – 2002 Reserves Premiership Coach and Former player Roy Laird was appointed coach following Alastair Clarkson's departure in February 2003. Scott Lee was appointed Assistant and Reserves Coach. The Bulldogs collected their 3rd Flag within the last 4 years when they defeated West Adelaide. Centrals become the first club to win the League, Reserves and Under 19's titles in the same season.

2004 – Central's 4th Premiership in the 2004 Grand Final against Woodville-West Torrens by 125 points was the biggest winning margin in an SANFL finals match. Future club captain and coach for the 2021 season Paul Thomas was also the club's 5th Magarey Medallist.

2005 – Central's 5th Premiership (and 3rd in sequence) in the 2005 Grand Final was their 4th against Woodville-West Torrens this time by 28 points.

2006 – Saw the introduction of night SANFL matches under lights at Elizabeth Oval. In the first league match under lights, a crowd of 7,329 attended the match against Sturt. Also in 2006, Centrals played in their seventh consecutive SANFL Grand Final, equalling the record for the most consecutive Grand Final appearances, and setting a new SANFL record for seven consecutive second-semi final wins. After 8 consecutive finals victories against Woodville-West Torrens from 2000 to 2005, Centrals were defeated by the Eagles for the first time in the Grand Final.

2007 – Centrals won the minor round premiership, and then their sixth premiership flag in their 8th consecutive Grand Final appearance. Centrals, therefore, became the only club in SANFL history to have contested 8 consecutive Grand Finals, and also the only SANFL club with 8 consecutive 2nd Semi Finals wins. On 30 June 2007, Centrals defeated Norwood by 158 points, the Redlegs biggest loss on record.

2008 – Centrals extended this record run of consecutive Grand Final appearances to 9, also winning their 9th consecutive Second Semi Final. They also equalled the SANFL record of 7 Premierships in a decade by defeating Glenelg in the SANFL Grand Final before a crowd of over 34,000 at AAMI Stadium.

2009 – Centrals further extended these records, winning their 10th consecutive second-semi final, making their 10th consecutive Grand Final and winning their 8th premiership when they defeated Sturt in the Grand Final. The club's record of 10 Grand Finals and 8 premierships in a single decade (2000–2009) is now the all-time record in the long history of the SANFL, surpassing the dynasties of Norwood in the 1880-90s, Port in the 1950s and 1980-90s, and Sturt in the 1960s.

2010 – Central District won their 4th flag in a row beating Norwood by 6 points in front of more than 34,000 people. Ian Callinan won the Jack Oatey Medal for best on ground with 4 goals and twin brothers Chris and James Gowans equalled the record of career premiership medals won by Port Adelaide's Geof Motley when they collected their 9th SANFL Premiership Medal.

2011 – Centrals domination continued in the 2011 SANFL season. They won the minor premiership with 17 wins from their 20 games to finish three games clear of Norwood who finished second while captain Paul Thomas finished third in the Magarey Medal count, only 3 votes behind winner James Allan from North Adelaide. This caused controversy as Thomas, who was judged by many to be best on ground for the Dogs Round 22 win over Norwood, was not awarded any Magarey votes (which are awarded on a 3–2–1 basis) by the umpires for the game as he was reported for a high tackle on Norwood's Darren Pfeiffer in the final quarter of the match. Ultimately Thomas didn't have to face the tribunal as the Match Review Committee, who viewed the video evidence from the ABC telecast, deemed he had no case to answer but by that time the votes were locked away leading many, including Thomas and the CDFC believe he was robbed of his second medal win.

By finishing minor premiers, Centrals earned themselves a week's rest before their Second Semi-final match on 25 September. The Bulldogs easily defeated Norwood 12.5 (77) to 4.9 (33) in the 2nd semi to move into their record 12th consecutive SANFL Grand Final and their 14th since 1995. Centrals opponent was Woodville-West Torrens who after losing to Norwood by 61 points in the Qualifying defeated Norwood in the Preliminary Final by 44 points. In the Grand Final Centrals after trailing at every break (including by 24 points at 3/4 time) staged a remarkable comeback in the final quarter and fell just short by 3 points against The Eagles on Grand Final day with their last scoring shot in the dying seconds of the game being a behind. It was the Bulldogs 3rd Grand Final lost since 2000 and brought to an end a run of 4 consecutive Grand Final victories.

Between 2000 and 2011, such was the domination by the Bulldogs that they were the first side to qualify for the SANFL Grand Final every year with only 2002, 2006 and 2011 not being premiership-winning years. While their Grand Final record was 9–3, the Bulldogs held a remarkable 12–0 record in the Second Semi Final for the same period. In stark contrast to the period from 1964 to 1999, Centrals Finals record for the period 2000 to 2011 was Played 28 – Won 25 Lost 3 (2002,2006 & 2011 Grand Finals).

Finals Qualifications without success (2012–2020)

2012 – The run of 12 consecutive Grand Finals appearances ended in 2012 after finishing the Minor Round in 2nd position, Centrals lost both finals – Qualifying to West Adelaide by 27 points and the 1st Semi Final to North Adelaide by 88 points.

2013 – Centrals qualified for the Finals for the 14th successive season but lost the Elimination Final to North Adelaide.

2014 – For the 1st time since 1999 and only the 2nd time in 21 seasons Centrals failed to qualified for the Finals – finishing 7th after winning just 2 games (against Norwood and North Adelaide) in the first 9 rounds but then winning 7 out of the last 8 games (losing to Norwood) before losing in the last round to North Adelaide and missing the finals by one win and percentage. So in a season of 2 halves – Centrals defeated every team once (including 4 of 5 finalists in the 2nd half of the season), but also lost to every team once.

2015 – After being out of the Top 5 all season, Centrals made another late dash and qualified by percentage for the Finals by defeating 5th place South Adelaide on their home ground in the last round. Centrals won 6 out of their last 8 games including their last 3 games, whilst South Adelaide lost 4 out of their last 5 games. In the first 2 weeks of the Finals Centrals defeated both of the 2014 Grand Finalists. Norwood in the Elimination Final (ending their quest for a 4th successive Flag) and Port Adelaide by 5 pts in the 1st Semi. However, the run of 5 wins came to halt in the Preliminary Final with a lost to West Adelaide who went on to win their First Flag since 1983.

2016 – Qualifying for the Finals in 5th place and for the 16th time in the last 17 seasons – Centrals were decisively defeated by the Adelaide Crows Reserves in the Elimination Final.

2017 – Centrals again qualified for the Finals in 5th place on percentage after Glenelg lost in the last round. Centrals (5th), South (6th), Glenelg (7th) all finished with 8 wins and were separated only on Percentage. Centrals defeated Norwood in the Elimination Final – giving the Dogs their 5th successive victory over the Redlegs in Finals. Centrals lost to Sturt in the 1st Semi Final after trailing by 2 pts at 3 quarter time in what was a close game all day by 7 points. Sturt went on to defeat Port Adelaide in the Grand Final by 1 point.

After qualifying for the Finals 17 times out of the last 18 seasons (2000–2017) and 23 times out of the last 25 seasons (1993-2017), missing only 1999 and 2014, Centrals have failed to qualify for the last 3 seasons – 2018, 2019 and 2020.

2019 – At the end of the season Roy Laird retired after 17 Seasons (which included 7 League Flags) as the League Coach.

Since 2012 – Centrals Finals record is played 9, won 3 (Norwood twice, Port Adelaide once) Lost 6

Home ground
Elizabeth Oval – 12 Goodman Road, Elizabeth (X Convenience Oval) (1964–present)  Central's First League Home Game at Elizabeth Oval was in Round 12 vs Glenelg on Saturday, 11 July 1964.

Current playing list

Achievements

Team records

Individual

SANFL Hall of Fame
South Australian Football Hall of Fame Inductees who have coached and/or played for Central District

Interstate Football Hall of Fames
Inductees who have coached and/or played for Central District

Daniel Hulm Memorial Trophy
The Daniel Hulm Memorial Trophy is awarded to the Central's Most Courageous Player.
Past Winners

SANFL Magarey Medalists
Six players from Centrals have won the Magarey Medal for best and fairest player in the SANFL season.

Jack Oatey Medalists
Players from Centrals have won the Jack Oatey Medal for best on ground during the League Grand Final on nine occasions, with Chris Gowans winning the award twice.

Bob Quinn Medal
(Best on ground – ANZAC Day Grand Final re-match)

SANFL leading goalkickers / Ken Farmer Medalists
Four players from Centrals have won the Ken Farmer Medal for being the leading goal kicker at the end of the minor round season.

* Top goalkicker at the end of the minor round. Ken Farmer Medal was instigated in 1981.

CDFC all time leading goalkickers

League Coaches

italics current coach
* Premiership Coach

State Captains

Fos Williams Medal (Best on ground – State game)

All Australian

SANFL Reserves Magarey Medalists
Centrals players who have won the Reserves Magarey Medal for best and fairest player in the SANFL season.

List of Central District Football Club records

SANFL Premiers: 9 – 2000, 2001, 2003, 2004, 2005, 2007, 2008, 2009, 2010
SANFL Grand Finalists: 14 – 1995, 1996, 2000–2011 (12 consecutive years)
Home Ground: Elizabeth Oval (X Convenience Oval) – SANFL league games 1964 to 2020 – Played 479 / Wins 305 / Draw 1 / Losses 173
Record Attendance at Elizabeth Oval: 16,029 v  in Round 18, 1984
Record Night Attendance at My Money House Oval: 7,329 v Sturt in April 2006
Record Attendance: 46,132 v  at Football Park, 1996 SANFL Grand Final
Most Games: 308 by Peter Vivian (1969–85)
Most Goals in a Season: 104 by Greg Edwards in 1982
Most Goals for the Club: 475 by Rudi Mandemaker (1986–92)
First player to kick 100 goals in an SANFL season: Greg Edwards (1982 – 104 goals)
Most Years as Coach: 17 by Roy Laird (2003–2019)
Most Premierships as Coach: 7 by Roy Laird (2003–05, 2007–10)
Most Years as Captain: 9 by Paul Thomas(2007–2015)
Most Premierships as Captain: 5 by Daniel Healy (2000–01, 2003–05)
Most Best & Fairest – Norm Russell Medallist: 3 by Jarrod Schiller (2014,2019,2021)
Highest Score: 35.23 (233) v West Torrens 4.11 (35) at Elizabeth Oval in Round 4, 1988
Consecutive Wins : 16 (Rd15 2001 to Rd6 2002)

Summary of Records versus other Clubs

SANFL Overall win–loss record (1964–2020)
 1223 matches / 644 wins / 570 losses / 9 draws (52.74%)

SANFL Games Win/loss record (1964 to 2020) vs

SANFL Finals Win/loss record (1964 to 2020) vs

SANFL Finals Win/loss Summary (1964 to 2020)

Club song
The Central District Football Club song is called "We're a winning team at Centrals". Sung to the tune of "Yankee doodle dandy"

We're a winning team at Centrals
We're the mighty fighting 'dogs
We love our Club and we play to win
Riding the bumps with a grin, at Centrals
Come what may you'll find us striving
Teamwork is the thing that talks
One for all and all for one
Is the we play at Centrals
We are the mighty fighting 'Dogs!

CDFC Honour Board 1959–1963 (SANFL Reserves)

CDFC Honour Board 1964–2022 (SANFL League)

SANFL Grand Final Premiership Teams

2000 Central District Premiership Team

2000 – Central District 8.13 (61) defeated Woodville-West Torrens 5.9 (39) – Crowd: 34,819

Goals: 
3 – Stuart Dew 
3 – Daniel Healy 
1 – Kynan Ford 
1 – James Gowans

2001 Central District Premiership Team

2001 – Central District 10.11 (71) defeated Woodville-West Torrens 4.8 (32) – Crowd: 26,378

2003 Central District Premiership Team

2003 – Central District 17.9 (111) defeated West Adelaide 11.11 (77) – Crowd: 28,199

Goals: 
5 – Eddie Sansbury 
2 – Richard Cochrane, Chris Gowans, James Gowans, Matthew Slade 
1 – Daniel Schell, Nathan Steinberner, Heath Hopwood, Brent Guerra

2004 – Central District 23.15 (153) defeated Woodville-West Torrens 4.4 (28) – Crowd: 24,207
2005 – Central District 15.14.(104) defeated Woodville-West Torrens 11.10 (76) – Crowd: 28,637
2007 – Central District 16.11 (107) defeated North Adelaide 5.12 (42) – Crowd: 30,478
2008 – Central District 17.10 (112) defeated Glenelg 11.10 (76) – Crowd: 34,128
2009 – Central District 13.14 (92) defeated Sturt 7.12 (54) – Crowd: 35,647
2010 – Central District 10.11 (71) defeated Norwood 9.11 (65) – Crowd: 34,355

SANFL Grand Final Losses
1995 SANFL Grand Final – Central District 6.10 (46) lost to  13.16 (94) – Crowd: 45,786
1996 SANFL Grand Final – Central District 6.8 (44) lost to  11.14 (80) – Crowd: 46,120
2002 SANFL Grand Final – Central District 6.9 (45) lost to Sturt 13.14 (92) – Crowd: 35,187
2006 SANFL Grand Final – Central District 7.3 (45) lost to Woodville-West Torrens 17.19 (121) – Crowd: 25,130
2011 SANFL Grand Final – Central District 11.12 (78) lost to Woodville-West Torrens 12.9 (81) – Crowd: 25,234

SANFL Reserves Premierships
2003 Reserves Grand Final – at AAMI Stadium

2012 Reserves Grand Final – 7 Oct at AAMI Stadium

David Haydon (Central) won the Bob Lee Medal for being judged as the best afield. 
Central BEST: D. Haydon, B. Nason, C. O’Sullivan, B. Castree, S. Colquhoun. 
GOALS: J. Lawton 3, J. Martin 3, T. Dunne 2, C. Edmead, J. Sutherland, T. Boyd, M. Westhoff

Feeder Leagues
Barossa Light & Gawler Football Association,
Adelaide Plains Football League,
North Eastern Football League,
Northern Areas Football Association,
South Australian Amateur Football League (northern metro clubs)

Club Ambassadors

As of 2018 the Central District Football Club has seven club ambassadors. They are:

Kevin Scarce – retired Royal Australian Navy officer and 34th Governor of South Australia
Tony Pilkington – 5AA Radio Personality
Professor Kevin Norton –  Professor of Exercise Science in the School of Health Sciences at the University of South Australia
Ray Grigg – Mayor of Walkerville and former RAA president
Rod Keane – former GM Holden Executive Director of Manufacturing
Darren Lehmann – former player and head coach of the Australia national cricket team

References

External links 

 
 In-Depth Look at the history of the Bulldogs
 Full Points Footy History of Centrals
 SA Football Hall of Fame – Ken J Eustice

South Australian National Football League clubs
SANFL Women's League
Australian rules football clubs in South Australia
1959 establishments in Australia